Harold Edgar McMunn (October 6, 1902 – February 5, 1964) was a Canadian ice hockey player who competed in the 1924 Winter Olympics. He was born in Lanark, Ontario, but grew up in Winnipeg, Manitoba.

McMunn was a member of the Toronto Granites team that won a gold medal for Canada in ice hockey at the 1924 Winter Olympics.

As a junior ice hockey player, McMunn won the 1921 Memorial Cup as a member of the Winnipeg Junior Falcons.

References

External links
profile

1902 births
1964 deaths
Canadian ice hockey right wingers
Ice hockey players at the 1924 Winter Olympics
Olympic gold medalists for Canada
Olympic ice hockey players of Canada
Olympic medalists in ice hockey
Medalists at the 1924 Winter Olympics
Winnipeg Maroons players